Khangkhungkherrnitz is the debut album of Filipino alternative rock band Parokya ni Edgar, released in 1996 by Universal Records.

Track listing

The name "Charles Manlapato" is also mentioned in their album Bigotilyo. After this filler comes a hidden track but it was considered as part of the filler.

Notes
Morlock, the dog that was mentioned in "Buloy" is seen on the disc.

References

External links 
 Official site

1996 debut albums
Parokya ni Edgar albums
Universal Records (Philippines) albums